Psidium friedrichsthalianum, the Costa Rican guava or cas, is a species of guava found mostly in Costa Rica but also grown in Guatemala, Nicaragua and other Central American countries. It can be found in Nicaragua as "guava juice" or "fresco de guava". This fruit is commonly used to prepare a sour and refreshing drink. It has been successfully grown in California now and can be grown from seed in mild higher regions.

It is used as the base for fresco de Cas, in which Costa Ricans mix it with sugar and water and sometimes add cream for a slightly acidic fruit drink.

The cas fruit was described by Otto Karl Berg in 1893.

References

Crops originating from the Americas
friedrichsthalianum
Tropical fruit
Flora of Central America